was a Japanese professional sumo wrestler from Tokyo. He was the sport's 44th yokozuna. He won ten top division yūshō or tournament championships and was a rival of fellow yokozuna Wakanohana I. He became the head coach of Kasugano stable in 1959 and was head of the Japan Sumo Association from 1974 until 1988.

Early career
One of few yokozuna to hail from the city rather than the country, he was born in what is now Koiwa, Edogawa. He was a fine all round athlete in elementary school, and although he had no family connections to sumo, he was introduced by a shop owner to Kasugano Oyakata, the former yokozuna Tochigiyama. He made his professional debut in January 1939. He was of such small size that he had to drink copious amounts of water to meet the weight requirement at his physical exam. However, his stablemaster, to whom Tochinishiki served as an attendant or tsukebito and was a great influence on him in his early days, expected him to become strong. He began using the Tochinishiki shikona or ring name in May 1944.

Top division career and yokozuna career

Tochinishiki reached the top makuuchi division in June 1947. He made up for his lack of size by showing superb technique. He won no fewer than nine special prizes for Technique, and it was even suggested that the prize had been created especially for him. Tochinishiki was known as the Mamushi (Viper) due to his tenacity once he grabbed hold of his opponent's mawashi.

In January 1951, he lost 7 consecutive bouts, but bounced back to win eight in a row and clinched his majority of wins or kachi-koshi on the final day, despite the bout being interrupted by a drunken spectator. After this performance, Tochinishiki began to raise his rank on the banzuke rapidly, taking his first top division championship in September 1952 and  earning promotion to ōzeki. He finally reached yokozuna in October 1954 after winning two successive championships. There had been four yokozuna in the September 1954 tournament, Kagamisato, Chiyonoyama, Yoshibayama and Azumafuji, but Azumafuji announced his retirement so as not to hinder Tochinishiki's promotion.

When Tochinishiki was promoted to yokozuna, he expected that his stablemaster Tochigiyama would commend him. However, his stablemaster told him, "From this day on, you should spend every day of your yokozuna life by thinking about the day you retire." At first, he struggled somewhat against heavier wrestlers, but he raised his weight to around 130 kg and became a wrestler able to use more orthodox methods. Between March 1959 and March 1960, he won 95 bouts and lost only 10.

Tochinishiki had a great rivalry with yokozuna Wakanohana Kanji I, who reached the top rank in January 1958. They were of a similar build, and each won ten top division tournament championships in their careers, with Tochinishiki coming out slightly ahead in their personal meetings with 19 wins out of 35 bouts. In July 1959 he defeated Wakanohana on the final day and won the championship with a perfect 15–0 score despite the fact that his father had been fatally hit by a truck the previous day.
In October 1959 his stablemaster died suddenly and Tochinishiki became head coach of Kasugano stable whilst still an active wrestler (a practice no longer permitted). After losing to Wakanohana in a championship-deciding match on the final day of the March 1960 tournament, he decided to retire from active competition two days into the following tournament.

Later life
In addition to his position as stable boss, Tochinishiki was also the chairman (rijichō) of the Japan Sumo Association from 1974 to 1988, making him the longest serving chairman to date. Under his direction the new Ryōgoku Kokugikan was built in 1985. Suffering from diabetes, he stood down voluntarily, allowing his old rival Wakanohana to ascend to the position. During his tenure as head of the Association, in 1985, Tochinishiki performed his kanreki dohyō-iri or '60th year ring entrance ceremony' to commemorate his years as yokozuna. He died in January 1990, following a stroke. He had been due to retire from the Sumo Association the following month when he would have turned 65 years old.

Pre-Modern Top division record

Through most of the 1940s only two tournaments were held a year. In 1953 the New Year tournament began and the Spring tournament resumed in Osaka.

Modern top division record
Since the addition of the Kyushu tournament in 1957 and the Nagoya tournament in 1958, the yearly schedule has remained unchanged.

See also
Glossary of sumo terms
Kanreki dohyo-iri
List of past sumo wrestlers
List of sumo tournament top division champions
List of sumo tournament top division runners-up
List of yokozuna

References

External links

 Japan Sumo Association profile

1925 births
1990 deaths
Japanese sumo wrestlers
Sumo people from Tokyo
Yokozuna